Francis Stanfield (18351914) was an English Catholic priest, composer and hymnodist who worked in the Roman Catholic Archdiocese of Westminster and is noted for having written and composed several hymns including Sweet Sacrament Divine. He was the son of the painter Clarkson Stanfield.

Life
Stanfield was born in London, one of the sons of the marine painter, and friend of Charles Dickens, Clarkson Frederick Stanfield.

He was educated at St Edmund's College, Ware. After ordination, he was stationed in Hertford. He then became principally in conducting missions and retreats. He was later priest in charge at Old Hall Green.

Stanfield wrote over a dozen hymns for various occasions. He is noted as the author of the hymn Sweet Sacrament Divine for which he also composed the music, the tune being called "Divine Mysteries." His hymn "Hear Thy Children Gentle Jesus, While We Breathe Our Evening Prayer" uses the tune Drakes Broughton (by Elgar).

References

1835 births
1914 deaths
19th-century English Roman Catholic priests
20th-century English Roman Catholic priests
English hymnwriters
19th-century English musicians